Jeevitha or popularly known as Jeevitha Rajasekhar is an Indian actress, who has primarily worked in the Southern film industry (featuring in predominantly Tamil and Telugu language movies) of the Indian film industry. She was a prominent leading actress and was often cast as the second heroine during the 80s era. She's also a director and producer now. After marriage to her co-star-turned-husband Rajasekhar in 1991, Jeevitha chose to completely step away from the limelight of acting and further focused on her marriage and family. Instead, became a backbone strength to supporting her husband’s acting career. She later became a director and a producer for Rajasekhar’s films, many of which are remakes such as Seshu (2002).

Partial filmography

As actress

As director and producer

References

External links 
 

Indian film actresses
Living people
Telugu film directors
Telugu film producers
Actresses in Tamil cinema
Actresses from Tamil Nadu
Film producers from Tamil Nadu
Indian women film producers
Film directors from Tamil Nadu
Indian women film directors
Actresses in Telugu cinema
Actresses in Kannada cinema
20th-century Indian actresses
21st-century Indian actresses
21st-century Indian film directors
Businesswomen from Tamil Nadu
1966 births